Berthold Korts (21 May 1912 – presumably 29 August 1943) was a German Luftwaffe military aviator during World War II, a fighter ace credited with 113 aerial victories—that is, 113 aerial combat encounters resulting in the destruction of the enemy aircraft—claimed in an unknown combat missions. He was "ace-in-a-day" four times, shooting down five or more aircraft on a single day.

Born in Karlsruhe, Korts was trained as a fighter pilot and posted to Jagdgeschwader 52 (JG 52–52nd Fighter Wing) in June 1942. Fighting on the Eastern Front, he claimed his first aerial victory on 6 August 1942 during Case Blue, the German strategic 1942 summer offensive in southern Russia. In July 1943, he was appointed Staffelkapitän (squadron leader) of 9. Staffel (9th squadron) of JG 52. On 17 August, Korts claimed his 100th aerial victory. A little more than a week later, on 29 August, he was awarded Knight's Cross of the Iron Cross, the highest award in the military and paramilitary forces of Nazi Germany during World War II. That day, Korts and his wingman went missing in action following combat near Amvrosiivka.

Career
Korts was born on 21 May 1912 in Karlsruhe, at the time in what was the Grand Duchy of Baden of the German Empire. His military career began with the artillery before he started his pilot training in the summer of 1940. In June 1942, holding the rank of Feldwebel, he was transferred to 9. Staffel (9th squadron) of Jagdgeschwader 52 (JG 52—52nd Fighter Wing) on the Eastern Front. At the time, this squadron was under the command of Hauptmann Hermann Graf and one of three squadrons subordinated to the III. Gruppe (3rd group) of JG 52 commanded by Major Hubertus von Bonin. On 28 June, German forces had launched Case Blue, the strategic summer offensive in southern Russia. On 7 July, Army Group A began their advance towards the oil fields in the Caucasus.

In early August 1942, III. The Gruppe supported the 1st Panzer Army in its advance towards Maykop and Grozny. There, Korts claimed his first aerial victory over a Lavochkin-Gorbunov-Gudkov LaGG-3 fighter on 6 August. On 10 August, III. Gruppe was moved to Armavir and 9. Staffel was ordered to a makeshift airfield at Plastunowskaja where it supported the attack of the 17th Army across the Kuban River on Novorossiysk. The next day, Korts claimed two Douglas A-20 Havoc, also referred to as "Boston" bombers, shot down.

On 27 August, III. Gruppe reached an airfield named Gonschtakowka located north-northeast of Mozdok on the Terek. On 19 September, III. Gruppe reached an airfield named Soldatskaya, west of Mozdok. The Gruppe would remain here until 1 January 1943 but would also use airfields at Mozdok and Digora. There Korts, who flew with the Gruppenstab (headquarters unit) of III. Gruppe, shot down a Yakovlev Yak-1 fighter on 30 September, his tenth aerial victory. On 28 November, he claimed "Boston" bomber destroyed, his 21st aerial victory and last in 1942.

Kuban bridgehead and Kursk
The Gruppe was moved to the combat area of the Kuban bridgehead on 1 April 1943 where it was based at an airfield at Taman. Operating from Taman until 2 July, III. Gruppe also flew missions from Kerch on 12 May, from Sarabuz and Saky on 14 May, Zürichtal, present-day Solote Pole, a village near the urban settlement Kirovske on 23 May, and Yevpatoria on 25/26 June. Korts became an "ace-in-a-day" for the first time on 26 May, claiming four Petlyakov Pe-2 bombers and a Soviet-flown Supermarine Spitfire fighter shot down. The following day, he again claimed five aerial victories, making him an "ace-in-a-day" for the second time.

In preparation for Operation Citadel, III. Gruppe was relocated to the central sector of the eastern Front. The Gruppe first moved to Zaporizhzhia and then to Ugrim on 3 July. There, under the command of Luftflotte 4, they supported Army Group South fighting on the southern flank of the salient. On 5 July, the first day of the Battle of Kursk, Hauptmann Günther Rall replaced von Bonin as Gruppenkommandeur (group commander) of III. Gruppe. That day, Korts claimed three LaGG-3 fighters and an Ilyushin Il-2 ground-attack aircraft. This includes a claim over a Soviet fighter shot down near Oboyan. A week later, Korts was awarded the German Cross in Gold on 12 July 1943. That day, Soviet forces launched Operation Kutuzov and advanced towards Orel from the north and east. Two days later, III. Gruppe was ordered to an airfield at Sowjetzki just north of Orel near the Oka river. There, Korts claimed four aerial victories, one on 16 July, two on 17 July, and one 18 July. On 20 July, the Gruppe moved to Ivanovka near Bryansk where it was subordinated to Jagdgeschwader 54 (JG 54—54th Fighter Wing).

Squadron leader and missing in action

Promoted to an officer's rank, Korts was appointed Staffelkapitän (squadron leader) of 9. Staffel (9th squadron), also referred to as the Karaya-Staffel of JG 52, on 27 July 1943. He replaced Oberleutnant Rudolf Trepte who had temporarily led the Staffel after Hauptmann Ernst Ehrenberg had been killed in action on 10 May. At the time, III. Gruppe was based at Ivanovka near Bryansk and engaged in the fighting near Orel during Operation Kutuzov. On 28 July, the Bryansk Front, supported by ground attack aircraft, attacked the German forces at Oryol. During the course of the day, Korts claimed a LaGG-3 fighter shot down west of Bolkhov. The following day, he claimed another LaGG-3 fighter destroyed. On 2 August, III. Gruppe moved to an airfield at Warwarowka, located south of Belgorod, where they stayed for three days. There, Korts claimed a total of fifteen aerial victories, including his 75th aerial victory on 3 August. On 4 August, strong Soviet forces breached the right defensive flank of the 4th Panzer Army. In defense of this attack, III. Gruppe was engaged in combat near Tomarovka, northwest of Belgorod. In total, the Gruppe claimed 42 aerial victories that day, including nine of which by Korts. This made him an "ace-in-a-day" for the third time.

On 5 August, the Gruppe moved to an airfield at Kharkov-Rogan airfield, southeast of Kharkov. Flying from this airfield, Korts claimed five aerial victories until III. Gruppe was ordered to Kharkov-Waitschenko, southeast of Kharkov-Rogan, on 11 August. He claimed two LaGG-3 fighters shot down on 14 August, the day the Gruppe relocated to Pereshchepyne. Flying from Pereshchepyne, Korts reached the century mark on 17 August 1943 when he shot down two LaGG-3 fighters in the vicinity of Izium. He was the 50th Luftwaffe pilot to achieve the century mark. The following day, he claimed another LaGG-3 fighter before the Gruppe moved to Mikhaylovka. On 19 August, Korts became an "ace-in-a-day" for the fourth time, claiming three LaGG-3 fighters and two Il-2 ground-attack aircraft destroyed. On 23 August, III. Gruppe was ordered to an airfield at Makeyevka while Korts and his wingman Unteroffizier Hans-Otto Müller were sent to Kramatorsk for two days to liaise with a Romanian fighter unit there.

Korts and his unit received the announcement that he had been awarded the Knight's Cross of the Iron Cross on 29 August, the day he went missing in action. Flying Messerschmitt Bf 109 G-6 (Werknummer 15899—factory number), he and his wingman Müller in Bf 109 G-6 (Werknummer 15869) were last seen in combat with Soviet P-39 Airacobra fighters in the vicinity of Amvrosiivka. He was succeeded by Erich Hartmann as Staffelkapitän of 9. Staffel.

Summary of career

Aerial victory claims
According to US historian David T. Zabecki, Korts was credited with 113 aerial victories. Authors Obermaier and Spick also list Korts with 113 aerial victories. Mathews and Foreman, authors of Luftwaffe Aces — Biographies and Victory Claims, researched the German Federal Archives and found records for 108 aerial victory claims, all of which claimed on the Eastern Front. The authors Prien, Stemmer, Rodeike and Bock indicate that additional five aerial victories have been claimed by Korts, two of which end of June or early July 1943, and further three on 5 August 1943.

Victory claims were logged to a map-reference (PQ = Planquadrat), for example "PQ 0516". These sectors were then subdivided into 36 smaller units to give a location area 3 × 4 km in size.

Awards
Honour Goblet of the Luftwaffe on 1 February 1943 as Feldwebel and pilot
German Cross in Gold on 12 July 1943 as Leutnant in the Stab III./Jagdgeschwader 52
Knight's Cross of the Iron Cross on 29 August 1943 as Leutnant and pilot in the 9./Jagdgeschwader 52

See also
List of people who disappeared

Notes

References

Citations

Bibliography

External links

1912 births
1940s missing person cases
1943 deaths
Aerial disappearances of military personnel in action
Aviators killed by being shot down
Luftwaffe personnel killed in World War II
German World War II flying aces
Military personnel from Karlsruhe
Missing aviators
Missing in action of World War II
Missing person cases in Ukraine
People from the Grand Duchy of Baden
Recipients of the Gold German Cross
Recipients of the Knight's Cross of the Iron Cross